is a Japanese manga series produced by Ark Performance and serialized in Shōnen Gahosha's Young King Ours. Twenty-four manga volumes have been released and an anime series by Sanzigen aired from October to December 2013. The same studio also produced two films based on the series, released in January and October 2015.

Plot
Due to global warming and rising sea levels in the early 21st century, much of Earth's landmass has been lost. In 2039, fleets of powerful sentient warships, armed with advanced technology and possibly 'alien' weaponry, mysteriously appear and devastate the world's naval forces. These ships, collectively known as 'The Fleet of Fog', impose a worldwide naval and aerial blockade, preventing humanity from both traveling the oceans and to other nations. During the blockade, the Fleet of Fog created Mental Models, humanoid avatars containing a ship's Union core, as a means to develop self cultivation and to overcome their lack of creative thinking of tactics that humans possessed, which at the same time made the Mental Models develop their own unique personality.

In 2056, 17 years after the blockade began, Gunzō Chihaya, a former student of the Japanese National Marine Academy, is the captain of a small group of privateers called the 'Blue Steel'. The Blue Steel are infamous for possessing a Fog submarine, the I-401, along with its Mental Model Iona, who defected to the human side. Due to I-401's technology and Gunzō's tactical skills, the Blue Steel have not only survived several encounters with the Fleet of Fog but managed to sink one of their most powerful warships.

Gunzō and his crew are hired by a faction of the Japanese government to deliver the prototype of the vibration warhead, a powerful weapon that may finally allow mankind to fight back against the Fog, to the United States. The United States is the only country with the resources and capability to mass-produce the weapon system. However, the Blue Steel will face obstacles on their journey not only from the Fleet of Fog and their human allies, but from other governments and factions with their own agendas. Along the way they will also gain allies of their own from both sides, increasing their chances against seemingly overwhelming odds.

Characters

Blue Steel Fleet

The main protagonist, captain of the I-401 and leader of the Blue Steel Fleet. He is not interested in destroying the Fleet of Fog, but to be on equal footing with them so negotiations leading to peace can be realized.
 / I-401

The Mental Model (human avatar) of the submarine I-401 who left the Fog to become Gunzō's vessel of her own volition.
In the Cadenza movie, it was revealed that the supreme flagship Yamato was defeated by her sister Musashi after she went on a rampage and had carried her last wish into Iona herself, therefore the reason for carrying dual cores inside her, which was to be Gunzō's vessel and negotiate with the Fleet of Fog to end the war, which was Gunzō's father's actions. After defeating Musashi by becoming one with Yamato, she disappears as she had served her purpose and bids Gunzō farewell. Over the course of the series, Iona has developed human emotions which led the other Fog vessels to classify her as a traitor, but those who came in contact with her have either defected to the Fog, joined the Blue Steel fleet, or had the ship's mental model experience errors. After defeating Hyuga, the crew of the I-401 salvaged and mounted the battleship's Super Gravitational Cannon onto the bow of the submarine. In the manga, she has been shown to use the M6A Seiran dive bombers that her real life counterpart was equipped with, making her the only Fog vessel ever seen to utilize aircraft. 

First Mate of I-401 who always wears a helmet supposedly due to allergies. He is Gunzō's closest friend and always knows what the latter is thinking. He wields the position as helmsman and executive-officer.

Weapons officer of I-401. Unlike the rest of his friends in the Blue Steel who were the top ten during their Naval Academy days, Kyōhei was in the 200th place. He also owns a huge collection of gravure idols merchandise and usually is the first to panic when the crew finds themselves in a pinch.

Engineer of I-401 who operates the engines of the vessel.

Sonar operator of I-401, she is also a capable soldier able to take down several troops with skill and strategy only. Her past is a mystery but it is known she's been to Taiwan.

A former Fog battleship and flagship of the Second Oriental Fleet who was defeated by Iona and her crew. Gunzō and the others salvaged her Super Gravitational Cannon and installed it on I-401. Hyūga's Mental Model (human avatar) has since become the port operator for the Blue Steel, with her ship's weapons and Wave Force Armor becoming the defenses for the island. She has been obsessed with Iona since their battle and views Iona's closeness to Gunzō as a hindrance to her affections, as well as Takao. Nevertheless, she cares for her companions' safety and assists with anything they need. She is also known to be a hacker, able to access the Fog vessels' systems and hack them in order to keep her vessels safe.
In the Cadenza movie, she restores Takao's ship by consuming half of the Iwo Jima islands and travels with Takao to combat the Fog vessels of the student council in order to defeat Musashi.

The Mental Model (human avatar) of the Fog heavy cruiser Takao. After Gunzō defeats her in battle, Takao falls in love with him and later joins the Blue Steel fleet. She is almost destroyed for good by Zordan's fleet but is saved in the nick of time by a surprise attack from Iona and Hyūga. However, her core is salvaged by I-402 and delivered to Yamato, who assigns her to infiltrate a human facility in a special mission with the promise of being allowed to return to Gunzō's side once it is accomplished. The spin-off manga Salty Road follows Takao's days among other humans during said mission.
In the Ars Nova adaptation, Takao sacrifices her vessel self to save Gunzō and the critically damaged I-401. This results in a super submarine called the Ars Nova with the processing capabilities and firepower of both Takao and Iona. She existed in a digital form inside the submarine's computer systems. At the end of the anime she regains her Mental Model form. In the Cadenza movie, she regains her ship after negotiating as a messenger to the Japanese government of the vibration warheads' codes with the help of Hyuga's skills and enters combat to save I-401 from the fog's student council and buys time in order for I-401 to defeat Musashi. She was originally equipped with a Super Gravitational Cannon, but her rebuilt ship instead used two large drills borrowed from the old base on Iwo Jima, much to Takao's annoyance.

Japanese government and military
As a result of the blockade by the Fleet of Fog, both the Japanese government and Self-Defense Forces were reorganized. The government is led by the Prime Minister who deal with their own local affairs while making important decisions together for the entire nation. The JSDF became an actual military force with an Army, Navy and Air Force. The remnants of United States Forces Japan that were left stranded after the Fleet of Fog blockade were absorbed into the Japanese Military where many American servicemen ended up marrying Japanese nationals and starting families.

The Prime Minister of Japan. Kaede was Ryōkan Kita's former XO but was injured during the battle between the UN Naval Fleet and Fleet of Fog which left him in a wheelchair and the use of cybernetics to help him see and speak.

The Assistant Secretary of Military Affairs. He hires Gunzō and the Blue Steel Fleet to transport the Vibration Torpedo, the first human made weapon capable of destroying a Fleet of Fog ship, to the United States for mass production. He faces rivalry with Ryōkan Kita and his supporters who have their own plans for the I-401.

A former United States Marine Corps officer, now a Japanese Navy Lieutenant and Commander of United States Forces Japan. He is an ally of Kamikage in helping the Blue Steel fleet in their mission to transport the Vibration Torpedo to the United States.

An influential member of the National Diet expected to be the next Prime Minister of Japan and Ryūjirō Kamikage's rival. A former captain of a Japanese Navy Destroyer, he was a veteran of the last Naval battle between the UN Naval Fleet and the Fleet of Fog. Kita wants the I-401 returned to the Japanese government so they can reverse engineer it and make their own Fleet of Fog ships which puts him at odds with Kamikage. He has connections within the Japanese Army who hope to regain their prestige after the government chose to focus on the Japanese Navy.

Vice-Admiral of the Japanese Navy. He is Gunzō's ally since he knew his father and supports Kamikage's plans for the Blue Steel fleet.

Captain of Hakugei 3, Japan's newest attack submarine. Thanks to the help of the I-401, the Hakugei was able to defeat Kirishima and Haruna, becoming the first human vessel to defeat not one but two Fog ships. He and Ryūjirō are old friends.

A Japanese naval academy third year midshipman brevet ranked as an Ensign when detached at sea and the former sonar operator of the I-401. She was a classmate of Gunzō during their academy days and was in love with him and was the first to join his crew. However, unable to stand seeing Gunzō endangering himself, she left the I-401 and rejoined the Japanese Navy.

The Prime Minister of Japan and Mayor of Sapporo. He was created through genetic engineering just like Makie to be a better government administrator. Due to his body not having natural bacteria to digest food, he takes special medication to eat. Makoto claims to have no emotions but cares about his creator Tōjūrō Osakabe and his sister Makie. As a favor to his creator, he warns him that the Japanese Army is planning to eliminate him and Makie after Haruna's identity is discovered and sends a team of Cyborg Special Forces to extract Makie to Hokkaido.

Fleet of Fog/Japan
This is the Fleet of Fog stationed in the Japanese territorial waters. They formed a blockade around Japan to prevent any human vessels and aircraft from fleeing to the open sea. There are 2 patrol fleets maintaining the blockade, the First and the Second Oriental Fleet. But when they found out that I-401 sinks Hyūga, the flagship of the Second Oriental Fleet, they are forced to reorganize, leaving a hole in the blockade. After they reorganize, Kongō is the new flagship of the Second Fleet while Nagato is the new flagship of the First Fleet.

The Supreme flagship of the Fleet of Fog and the one who gave the ability to the other ships to develop their own avatars. Yamato possesses two different avatars, one named after herself and another called Kotono. Both are modeled in appearance after the late Kotono Amaha, who was Gunzō's undefeated rival during his academy times and according to some of his friends, his love interest. It is uncertain if the Kotono Amaha that Gunzō knew was, in fact, human or Yamato's second avatar.
In the Cadenza movie, it was revealed that she and her sister Musashi had met up with Chihaya Shōzō, the then-admiral of the JMSDF in negotiating to end the war on the 2 sides and for both ends to live in harmony and peace. She then had doubts after which about the Admiralty code and agrees his proposal. But, after Shōzō was killed by the naval officers who deemed this as betrayal, she did not want to fight still due to her promise but was forced to after her sister Musashi's emotions became negative and starting going on a rampage to destroy the vessels commanded by the humans. Despite trying to stop her, She was eventually defeated and sunk. Before disappearing, she creates the I-401's Mental Model Iona and passes her will to her in hopes of ending the war. In the Cadenza film, she was reunited with Musashi after her defeat and accepted her, thanking Iona.

The flagship of the Second Oriental Fleet and Yamato's second in command.
In the Ars Nova adaptation, she pursues Iona and the other Mental Models who she believes to be acting abnormally due to their contact with Gunzō singlemindedly. After the intense fight with Iona at the end of the series, Iona befriends her after she realizes that her previously solitary life was somehow sad and lonely. After which, she leaves the Fleet of Fog to explore the world and does not join the Blue Steel Fleet. In the Cadenza film, her reformed self helps to save I-401 and restore her systems from the Student Council Fleet. She then engages in a fight with her sister Hiei, allowing I-401 to deal with Musashi.

The Flagship of the First Oriental Fleet and currently possesses two Mental Models. Nagato's interests lie within Japanese culture and she entertains herself by trying to act according to its customs.

A Fog battleship whose avatar takes the form of a teenage girl wearing a heavy coat that covers all of her body up to the nose. After a failed effort to defeat I-401, she befriends a girl named Makie and agrees to protect her after finding out the truth behind her, even if this means going against the Fog.
In the Ars Nova adaptation, both Haruna and Kirishima not only betray the Fog but also join the Blue Steel Fleet to serve their purpose. In the Cadenza film, She and kirishima restore their vessel therefore bearing a 2-in-1 ship and comes to assist I-401 in their battle with the Student Council Fleet, engaging Haguro to allow I-401 to escape and confront Musashi.

A Fog battleship who joined Haruna's effort to sink the I-401 in Yokosuka. Despite being able to combine with Haruna to form an even stronger vessel, both were defeated by I-401, with only her core surviving her destruction. It is later hidden inside a Teddy bear belonging to Makie. She slowly gets adjusted to using the Teddy bear as her stand-in Mental Model over the course of the series and assists the Blue Steel Fleet alongside Haruna and Makie.

Kongō's second in command and de facto leader of the Second Oriental Fleet after Kongō's disappearance. Her Mental Model is dressed as a high school student and governs over her subordinates in a system reflecting a student council, from which she is the self-proclaimed president. She's the sister ship of Kongō, Haruna and Kirishima.
In the Cadenza movie, she tasks the student council to destroy the I-401 having classified it as "Traitor of the Fog". She is later defeated by Kongō who stops her vessel, leaving it unmovable but not destroyed.

One of Hiei's subordinates. Following the departure of Kongō and Hiei to hunt I-401 down, Ise becomes the acting flagship of the First Oriental Fleet. She is Hyuga's older sister. 

Assigned to act under Haruna's command, she remains faithful to her even after she decides to oppose the Admiralty Code. She plays various musical instruments and is annoyed if anyone ignores her.
In the Ars Nova adaptation, Maya's Mental Model is revealed to be nothing more than an AI assigned to watch over Kongō, lacking the true ability to form her own avatar. She is absorbed by Kongō later on and never existed after her vessel was destroyed in the process of the battle between I-401 and Kongo.

One of two submarines who act directly under Yamato's orders and Iona's triplet sister. She is mostly seen wearing a Qipao. She and I-402 were defeated by I-401.

Another submarine directly under Yamato's orders and Iona's triplet sister. She is currently under Yamato's orders to keep watch on Takao during her mission at the Japanese Naval Academy while getting information from the locals. She and I-400 were defeated by I-401 later on.

One of Hiei's subordinates, whose Mental Model is also dressed as a high school student. She wears an eyepatch which she uses to snipe enemies from outside their effective detection range; her vessel is equipped with long range sniper cannons.

One of Hiei's subordinates and Myōkō's younger sister. She is Ashigara's partner and serves as the sonar operator, detecting enemy vessels utilizing her sonar scanner.

One of Hiei's subordinates, and Myōkō's younger sister. She's loud, brash, impatient and violent, who also tends to forget important things, such as when battling with the I-401 which she uses all her weapons on the submarine. She is equipped with a large energy harpoon firing from the seaplane catapult.

One of Hiei's subordinates and Myōkō's youngest sister, who seems to dislike wearing a school uniform. She is known to being the fastest ship of the Fog, having her vessel possessed with the most number of gravitation engines.

One of Hiei's subordinates and is the only one besides Kongō who doesn't wear a uniform. She is the sister of Takao and Maya.

A repair vessel under Kongō's command that has been helping her set up the Flagship equipment.

A destroyer that is a part of Yamato's personal guards. Even though she's just a destroyer, Yamato authorized her to have a Mental Model.

An Assault and Suppression vessel and one of largest vessels in the Fleet of Fog. Her Mental Model looks like a young girl and owns a pet cat. Although based on an aircraft carrier, Zuikaku was re-purposed into an assault and suppression vessel following the reveal that the copies of WWII aircraft that Fleet of Fog created were no match for fifth-generation jet fighters that humanity possessed at the time of the fleet's awakening. Zuikaku transported I-402 and Takao to the Yokosuka city suburbs so that the heavy cruiser could infiltrate the Japanese National Maritime Institute of Technology.

Fleet of Fog/Europe (Scarlet Fleet)

Gunzō's father who was a war hero during the last battle between the UN Naval Fleet and the Fleet of Fog, where he and his crew managed to capture the I-401 submarine. Shōzō was presumed to have died when he and his crew mysteriously disappeared after the I-401s maiden voyage to the Pacific only for the submarine to return to Japan a year later without its crew. However, two years before the start of the series, a spy drone discovered Shōzō and his crew were alive and on board the Fog warship Musashi, revealing they had defected to the Fleet of Fog. Now in command of the European Fleet of Fog, now known as the Scarlet Fleet, together with his flagship and avatar Musashi, the Scarlet Fleet forms an alliance with the United Kingdom to end the European War.
However, in the Cadenza film, it was revealed that Shōzō was actually an imitation created by Musashi. Prior to the series, being the then admiral of the JMSDF, Shōzō had negotiated with Musashi's elder sister Yamato into ending the war, to which she agreed. He was later killed by soldiers of the JMSDF who claimed that he had betrayed the navy. Therefore, he had never defected to the Fog to begin with.

Shōzō's flagship whose avatar is a blonde woman in a white coat. In the anime series, she has long white hair and wears a black swimsuit.
In the Cadenza movie, she and her sister Yamato agreed with Shōzō in a negotiation to end the war between the 2 sides. Initially she was a kind and shy girl, but after seeing the death of Shōzō by the soldiers of the JMSDF, she turns dark, ruthless and violent and begins attacking and destroying the JMSDF ships and even destroys her sister Yamato, who had tried to stop her. Ever since then, she becomes the Supreme flagship of the fog, and to hide her traumas, she created an AI of Shōzō who acts according to her wish. But eventually, she was defeated by Iona who had used Yamato's parts to become one with Yamato and reunites with her sister.

Two blond twin girls who are the avatars of the Bismarck. While capital ship Bismarck is often mentioned when one brings up the Admiralty Code, Bismarck herself hasn't been seen doing anything at all. She remains a passive observer at the moment.

Captain of the U-2501 under orders of Shōzō to intercept the Blue Steel.
Romuald
The U-2501's weapons officer.
Francette
The U-2501's sonar operator.
U-2501
Zordan's submarine Mental Model, who is forbidden to materialize it by him, as he claims it is unnecessary for a human-crewed ship. She has no known sisters, but is accompanied by a fleet of over three dozen "Seehund" miniature drone submarines and the resupply vessel Milchkuh. U-2501 is currently serving as a traitor-hunting submarine of the "Scarlet Fleet". U-2501 has a Mirror-Ring system installed: this allows her to absorb and then release as a shock-wave an attack of almost any power. It is unclear where from U-2501 received this upgrade, as no Fog submarine has enough power to have Mirror-Ring system of her own, with it usually only seen on battleships like Hiei, Musashi, and Yamato.
Repulse
A Fog battle-cruiser whose Mental Model appears dressed as a maid. She and Vampire are chased by a rogue element of the Fleet of Fog led by Hood who want the two vessels to join them, as they believe that Shōzō has abused his authority within the Fleet for his own plans and want him stopped. Repulse and Vampire have no interest in Hood's plans and wish to continue their original duty of maintaining the blockade, but they develop an interest in the Hakugei after the human vessel intervene in a battle against their pursuers on their favor. She is shy to meet Komaki and Hakugei's crew.
Vampire
A destroyer on the run with Repulse. She has no processing power enough to maintain a Mental Model, thus Repulse lent her some to create one, that just like Repulse's, appears dressed as a maid, albeit with a slight vampire-like theme. She is foul-mouthed and appears to be rather bratty.
Prince of Wales
Appears as a maid just like Repulse. She appeared to lead "persuasion" Repulse and Vampire to join Hood to suppress Shōzō Chihaya, and if that fails, to sink and repossess their cores.

Lexington
The first American ship seen in the series, Lexington behaves a lot like a 'genius ditz'. She's always surrounded by a mess in the form of multiple books, coffee mugs, and various trinkets she studies or works with. Usually, she's not very motivated, calling U-2501 an "unpleasant guest" and paying more attention to her books and trinkets than to Zordan Stark when he tries actually conversing with her. She had one Mental Model that looks like a rather tall and slender woman in her early twenties. While claiming her intention was to assist Kongō's fleet in fighting against I-401, Lexington has yet to make any hostile moves against I-401 and ends up engaged U-2501 in combat for a short time. It is later revealed that Lexington had been working ashore for the past year and a half as a university professor (with forged papers) and has a fascination with history.

Civilians

A "Design Child" who was genetically engineered to possess outstanding intellect. Of many attempts, she was the only one to survive past infancy. She developed the Vibration Torpedo, the secret weapon tasked to the Blue Steel. She is under the protection of Haruna and Kirishima after the military tried to assassinate her. She was on the bridge of the combined battleship formed by her two guardians during the final battle in the Arctic.
Lawrence Valentine/

Makie's butler who, unknown to her, is actually her "grandfather" Tōjūrō Osakabe, the creator of the design children. During the turmoil following the Fleet of Fog's blockade, Tōjūrō was tasked to create genetically engineered children that would help Japan survive. Tōjūrō, however, regrets creating the design children since only seven of the hundreds, if not thousands, were able to live. When the government plans to eliminate Makie after she designs the Vibration Torpedo, Tōjūrō uses his connections with the government to make a deal where they will spare her and provide her with a mansion under government surveillance with him as her butler. When he learns that Makie's new friend is actually the Fog Mental Model Haruna and the Japanese Army sends forces to not only capture Haruna but kill Makie to prevent the secrets of the Vibration Torpedo being exposed, he asks Haruna to protect Makie and help her escape Japan. Tōjūrō is killed after he stops an Army sniper trying to shoot Makie.
In the Ars Nova adaptation, Tōjūrō was a scientist tasked in creating the Vibration Torpedo but failed since he did not have the intellect to overcome the Torpedo's flaws. Therefore he created the genetically engineered Makie, who he treated as his own daughter. But when the government ordered him to create another design child to take over the Vibration Torpedo project as they now saw Makie as useless and planned to dispose of her, Tōjūrō faked his own death to ensure that the government could not create another design child and forced them to rely on Makie. By the time Haruna and Kirishima discover that he is still alive, the bedridden Tōjūrō has hidden himself under his mansion and watches over Makie via cameras. He asks the Mental Models to protect Makie and be her friends before he passes away.

Gunzō's mother and Shōzō's wife who is under house arrest for her own protection after her son and her husband deserted the Japanese military. She meets and befriends Takao when Takao decides to experience human life and unbeknownst to her, successfully deduces Takao's identity as a Mental Model.

Media

Manga
The manga began serialization on September 30, 2009, in Shōnen Gahōsha's Young King OURs magazine. The first tankōbon volume was released on April 30, 2010; twenty-four volumes have been published as of December 30, 2022. A guide book which contain a short story and Drama CD was also released. The series was licensed by Seven Seas Entertainment in July 2013, who released the first volume on July 1, 2014; seventeen volumes have been released as of December 2020.

A spin-off manga illustrated by TALI titled Salty Road which focuses on Takao, I-402, and Zuikaku during their infiltration of Yokosuka, began serialization on October 16, 2014, in Young King OURs magazine.

Anime
A CG rendered anime produced by Sanzigen titled Arpeggio of Blue Steel -Ars Nova-, began airing on October 7, 2013. The opening theme song is "Savior of Song" performed by Nano and MY FIRST STORY, and the two ending theme songs are performed by Trident which is composed of Mai Fuchigami, Manami Numakura, and Hibiku Yamamura: "Blue Field (ブルー・フィールド)" and "Innocent Blue". The television series features an anime original ending that differs from the plot of the manga. The rerun of the series on TV during 2014 was accompanied by a tie-in series of comedy shorts titled Kiri-Kuma's (Fog Bears) featuring the Fog characters in bear form. The anime television series has been licensed in North America by Crunchyroll, with distribution by Discotek Media, and they've released a Blu-ray/DVD Combo Pack of the series on November 4, 2016.

In September 2013, it was announced that there would be a collaborative project between the Arpeggio of Blue Steel anime and the online game Kantai Collection. Illustrators for Kadokawa Games, including Shibafu and Konishi, are responsible for drawing some of the end cards, which feature crossovers with Kantai Collection characters. An Arpeggio of Blue Steel in-game special event for Kantai Collection also took place from 24 December 2013 to 6 January 2014.

In June 2014, two animated films based on the manga were announced. The first, titled Arpeggio of Blue Steel -Ars Nova DC-, is a compilation of the TV series with extra scenes in its first half, with a new story in its second half. Nano performs the theme song, titled "Rock on.". The second film is an all new story. Both films were produced by the same staff of the anime series and released in 2015.

In 2017, scholar Takayoshi Yamamura noted that anime was produced with the collaboration of JSDF Yokosuka District Headquarters and other parts of the JSDF.

Episode list

Reception

References

External links
Official anime website 

2009 manga
2013 anime television series debuts
Action anime and manga
Anime series based on manga
Discotek Media
Fiction set in 2039
Films with screenplays by Makoto Uezu
Japan Self-Defense Forces in fiction
Japanese computer-animated television series
Manga adapted into television series
Military anime and manga
Sanzigen
Science fiction anime and manga
Seven Seas Entertainment titles
Shōnen Gahōsha manga
Shōnen manga
Submarines in fiction
Tokyo MX original programming